The EWF Tag Team Championship is the tag team professional wrestling title in the Southern California-based Empire Wrestling Federation independent promotion. It was established in 1996, when John Black and Johnny Love, The Ghetto Boyz, were declared the first champions. There have been a total of 42 recognized champion teams who have had a combined 60 official reigns.

Title history

References

External links
 EWF Tag Team Championship
Empire Wrestling Federation championships
Tag team wrestling championships